In constitutional usage in Commonwealth realms, a ministry (usually preceded by the definite article, i.e., the ministry) is a collective body of government ministers led by a head of government, such as a prime minister. It is described by Oxford Dictionaries as "a period of government under one prime minister". Although the term "cabinet" can in some circumstances be a synonym, a ministry can be a broader concept which might include office-holders who do not participate in cabinet meetings. Other titles can include "administration" (in the United States) or "government" (in common usage among most parliamentary systems) to describe similar collectives.

The term is primarily used to describe the successive governments of the United Kingdom, Canada, Australia and New Zealand, which share a common political heritage. In the United Kingdom and Australia a new ministry begins after each election, regardless of whether the prime minister is re-elected, and whether there may have been a minor rearrangement of the ministry. For example, after winning the 1979 general election, Margaret Thatcher (as Prime Minister of the United Kingdom) formed the first Thatcher ministry. After being re-elected at the 1983 general election, she formed the second Thatcher ministry, and so on. In Canada and New Zealand, a new ministry is formed only when there is a change of prime minister.

See also
 List of Australian ministries
 List of British governments
 List of Canadian ministries
 List of Indian union ministries
 List of New Zealand governments
 List of Scottish Government ministries
 List of Welsh Government ministries

References

Government
Commonwealth of Nations
Westminster system